Elytroleptus floridanus is a species of beetle in the family Cerambycidae. It was described by John Lawrence LeConte in 1862.

References

Elytroleptus
Beetles described in 1862